is a public park in Toshima Ward, Tokyo, Japan. It is open throughout the year. The park is the eighth largest in Toshima Ward.

Facilities
Chihaya Flower Park has various pieces of play equipment for children including swings and a slide.

Attractions
A prototype vehicle (12-000 series) of the Toei Ōedo Line (a subway) is located in the north side of the park.

See also
 Parks and gardens in Tokyo
 National Parks of Japan

References

 www.city.toshima.lg.jp

External links
 4travel.jp

Parks and gardens in Tokyo